The Australian of the Year Award is given annually on Australia Day. The national award is a major public event, televised nationwide. The Award also operates at the State level. This page lists winners of the South Australia state award, who are automatically finalists in the national competition.

Past winners of the South Australian of the Year Awards
2002: Robert Champion de Crespigny , businessman
 2003: Malcolm Kinnaird , engineer
 2005: Sister Janet Mead, nun
 2006: Richard Hunter, Ngarrinjeri Elder
 2008: Mike Turtur, cyclist
2009: Dr Bill Griggs , medical doctor
 2010: Maggie Beer , chef
2011: Dr Tanya Monro, physicist
2012: Robyn Layton , social justice advocate
2013: Sonya Ryan, internet safety campaigner
 2014: Felicity-Ann Lewis, community leader
 2015: Gill Hicks , MBE, peace campaigner
 2016: Dr John Greenwood , burns surgeon
 2017: Kate Swaffer, dementia advocate
 2018: Professor David David , craniofacial surgeon
 2019: Dr Richard Harris , anaesthetist and cave-diver
 2020: Dr James Muecke , Eye surgeon and blindness prevention pioneer
 2021: Tanya Hosch, Australian Football League executive
 2022: Professor Helen Marshall, vaccination researcher

References

External links

Lists of Australian award winners
 South
Lists of people from South Australia